Ulf Siemes (born 14 May 1978 in Oberhausen) is a German rower.

References 
 
 

1978 births
Living people
Sportspeople from Oberhausen
Olympic rowers of Germany
Rowers at the 2004 Summer Olympics
German male rowers
World Rowing Championships medalists for Germany